Ferdinand De Paige Moore (February 22, 1896 – May 6, 1947) was an American Major League Baseball infielder. He played first base  for the Philadelphia Athletics during the  season at the age of just 18 years old. He also served in the Navy in World War II. In 1947, Moore committed suicide after fatally shooting a friend.

References

Major League Baseball infielders
Philadelphia Athletics players
Baseball players from Camden, New Jersey
1896 births
1947 suicides
Suicides by firearm in New Jersey
Murder–suicides in the United States
United States Navy personnel of World War II